Broadwater is a national park in New South Wales, Australia, 577 km northeast of Sydney.

A wide range of various vegetation, coastal rainforests, swamps, open eucalyptus forests are a great refuge for many species of migratory birds.

Broadwater is a great place for a family trip, especially if you are a bird watcher.

See also
 Protected areas of New South Wales

References

National parks of New South Wales
Protected areas established in 1974
1974 establishments in Australia